{{Infobox person
| name          = Ashley Austin Morris
| image         = 
| alt           = 
| caption       = 
| birth_name    = Ashley Morris
| birth_date    = 
| birth_place   = San Antonio, Texas
| death_date    = 
| death_place   = 
| nationality   = American
| other_names   = 
| occupation    = Comedian, playwright, actress
| years_active  = 2004–present
| known_for     = Francine Carruthers on The Electric Company
| notable_works = 
}}

Ashley Austin Morris (born Ashley Morris) is an American comedian, playwright, and stage, television, and film actress. She is best known for her role as Francine Carruthers in the revival of the PBS Kids children's series The Electric Company, which ran from 2009 to 2011.

Career
Morris was born in San Antonio, Texas. After finishing high school, she joined a comedy troupe called "Viva La Vulva!" and contributed to the group's writing and sketch comedy. The following year, she enrolled at the University of North Carolina School of the Arts and co-starred in a production called Be Good, Daniel, a short comedy romance. She also wrote Libido Limbo, a play about Lady M, Nora, Blanche, and Medea being trapped in purgatory and being saved by Hillary Clinton, which was a finalist at Atlanta's Young Playwrights Festival.

Morris moved to New York City after graduating from the University of North Carolina School of the Arts, and landed roles in off-Broadway productions, first as Edith in Die, Mommie, Die! and then in Paper Dolls. She also performed stand-up comedy and starred for three seasons as Francine Carruthers, the leader of the Pranksters and a character with a very high opinion of herself and the power to generate violet word balls, in the 2009-2011 revival of The Electric Company, an educational children's program that employed sketch comedy and other entertaining devices to help elementary school children develop their grammar and reading skills and shown on the Public Broadcasting Service .

While performing on The Electric Company, Morris continued to also act on stage, including in the New York City off-Broadway productions Isabel and Bees, Love, Loss, and What I Wore, and In the Daylight, and appeared in episodes of the television shows Ugly Betty, The Good Wife, and Gravity.

After The Electric Company stopped making new episodes, she joined the rotating cast of Reading Under the Influence, and appeared in episodes of The Big Bang Theory and Desperate Housewives.

She was also in the video for "K.I.A. (Killed in Action)" from the album Shaka Rock by Jet, and had roles in the movies Premium Rush, Art Machine, Generation Um..., Putzel, Joke Writer'', and Sully. She has also continued to perform stand-up comedy routines, mainly in New York City.

Selected appearances

Film

Stage

Television

References

External links
 http://www.ashleyaustinmorriscomedy.com/
 

21st-century American actresses
Actresses from San Antonio
American film actresses
American stage actresses
American stand-up comedians
American television actresses
Living people
University of North Carolina School of the Arts alumni
Comedians from Texas
Year of birth missing (living people)
21st-century American comedians